The 2010–11 UMass Minutemen basketball team represented the University of Massachusetts Amherst during the 2010–11 NCAA Division I men's basketball season. The Minutemen, led by third year head coach Derek Kellogg, played their home games at William D. Mullins Memorial Center, with one home game played at Curry Hicks Cage, and are members of the Atlantic 10 Conference. They finished the season 15-15, 7–9 in A-10 play to finish for eighth place.

Roster

Schedule

|-
!colspan=9| Exhibition

|-
!colspan=9| Regular Season

|-
!colspan=9| 2011 Atlantic 10 men's basketball tournament

References

UMass Minutemen basketball seasons
Umass
UMass Minutemen basketball
UMass Minutemen basketball